Rape of the Sword is a 1967 Hong Kong wuxia film directed by Yueh Feng and produced by the Shaw Brothers Studio, starring Li Li-hua, Lee Ching, Chan Hung-lit, Kiu Chong and Tien Feng.

This film is believed by many, including Yuen Woo-ping (action choreographer for the 2000 film Crouching Tiger, Hidden Dragon), to be a loose adaptation of Wang Dulu's 1941 novel Crouching Tiger, Hidden Dragon, even though it doesn't explicitly state so. It has been noted that during the early Cultural Revolution it was impossible for the Shaw Brothers Studio (located in British Hong Kong) to get in contact with Wang Dulu (who lived in mainland China) to acquire the film rights.

Plot
The film starts out with two students fighting over the inheritance of their deceased master's sword called the "Green Frost Sword". Eventually, Han kills the other student and takes the sword. Han then brings it back to the king.

Later, General Zhong Ki, his daughter Zhong Jiaolong, and her servant Geng Liuniang visit the king. The king later forces the general to make his daughter marry Prince Lu Tianxia. Then at night, Geng, revealing herself to be an expert martial artist, goes to steal the "Green Frost Sword".  She brings Jiaolong away to save her from marrying the prince. The prince arrives with his henchmen and a big fight occurs in which Geng seriously wounds the prince. Geng and Jiaolong then go into hiding. Jiaolong becomes Geng's disciple where she teaches her kung fu.

The king sees his son wounded and that the "Green Frost Sword" is gone. Han knows who the culprit is and the king sends him to find the suspect.

The next day Geng leaves a note to Jiaolong and leaves, but Han finds her. Geng is then revealed to be the widow of the student Han killed in the beginning of the film. They then fight and Han overpowers Geng, heavily injuring her while taking the sword back. Han assumes that she is dead. Jiaolong sets out and manages to find her teacher.

One day, Jiaolong goes out and meets a good bandit named Luo Yihu. Jiaolong fights briefly with him before bringing him home where he finds out who her teacher is. Luo turns out to be the disciple of Geng's kung fu elder sister.  The three of them revolt against the evil king and get the "Green Frost Sword" back. They also meet a rebellious nobleman Master Liu who joins them.

They engage in a big fight where Han is eventually killed but Prince Lu Tian Xia manages to get away. In the end, the heroes decide to retreat and hope to get the prince later.

Cast

Li Li-hua as Geng Liuniang, nicknamed "Jade Fox"
Lee Ching as Zhong Jiaolong (based on Yu Jiaolong in the novel)
Chan Hung-lit as Prince Lu Tianxia
Kiu Chong as Luo Yihu (based on Luo Xiaohu in the novel)
Tien Feng as General Zhong Ki
Tang Ti as Chief Instructor Han
Lee Wan-chung as King Wuyi
Yeung Chi-hing as Master Liu
Ku Feng as Lo's man
Fan Mei-sheng as Lo's man
Hao Li-jen as Zhong's servant
Tsang Choh-lam as Zhong's soldier
Chui Chung-hok as Lo's fighter
Chow Siu-loi as Lo's fighter
Tung Choi-bo as Lo's fighter
Cheung Hei as Prince's official
Chan Ho as palace guard
Wu Ma as Master Liu's man
Chin Chun as Master Liu's man
Nam Wai-lit as Lu's soldier
Ng Ho as Lu's soldier
Yee Kwan as Lu's soldier
Chu Gam as Lu's soldier
Wong Mei as Lu's soldier
Lo Wai as Lu's soldier
Hsu Hsia as Lu's soldier
Chan Chuen as Lu's soldier
Yen Shi-kwan as Lu's soldier
Yuen Woo-ping as Lu's soldier
Chan Siu-pang as Lo's man
Lau Kar-leung as Han's thug
Wong Ching as Lu's soldier
Fung Hap-so as Lu's soldier
Wu Por as Lu's soldier
Chan Siu-gai as Lu's soldier

References

External links

Rape of the Sword at Hong Kong Cinemagic

1967 films
1960s action films
1960s martial arts films
Hong Kong action films
1960s Mandarin-language films
Hong Kong martial arts films
Kung fu films
Wuxia films
Shaw Brothers Studio films
Films based on Chinese novels
Films directed by Yueh Feng